Olga Mišková defeated Violette Rigollet in the final, 6–4, 6–2 to win the girls' singles tennis title at the 1948 Wimbledon Championships.

Draw

Final

Group A

Group B

References

External links

Girls' Singles
Wimbledon Championship by year – Girls' singles
Wimbledon Championships
Wimbledon Championships